Manuel Quispe was a Q'ero elder and medicine man. He died on December 11, 2004, in Chua Chua.http://www.vanishingcultures.org/DonManuelQuispe.html vanishingcultures.org 

Quispe was a mentor to many people] and taught them shamanic knowledge and rites, and the kuraq akulliq ("major coca chewer"), the Andean Shamanic degrees.

References

Peruvian people of Quechua descent
2004 deaths
Year of birth missing
Folk healers